Phytoecia rufa is a species of beetle in the family Cerambycidae. It was described by Stephan von Breuning in 1950.

Subspecies
 Phytoecia rufa rufa Breuning, 1950
 Phytoecia rufa allardi Breuning, 1974

References

Phytoecia
Beetles described in 1950